Donald James Kirk an American accountant, was chair of the Financial Accounting Standards Board.

He became a partner with Price Waterhouse in 1967.

He was one of the initial board members appointed to the Financial Accounting Standards Board (FASB) in 1973.  In 1977 he became the second chairman of FASB, and served in that role for 9 years until his eligibility expired.  He oversaw the transition of FASB meetings from closed, confidential meetings to being open and public.

He has written 40 articles in professional journals, and he was a professor at Columbia University from 1987 to 1995.

He was inducted into the Accounting Hall of Fame in 1996.

Sources
Donald James Kirk biography, at OSU's Accounting Hall of Fame

Living people
Columbia University faculty
Columbia University Graduate School of Journalism faculty
People from Shaker Heights, Ohio
Financial Accounting Standards Board members
Journalists from Ohio
Year of birth missing (living people)